Frozen bananas are desserts made by placing a banana upon a stick, freezing it, and usually dipping it in melted chocolate or yogurt. They may be covered with toppings such as chopped nuts, sprinkles, sugar and crushed cookies.

History

Don Phillips, also known as the frozen banana king, opened the first frozen banana stand - The Original Frozen Banana - on Balboa Peninsula, located in Orange County, California, circa 1940.  In 1963, Bob Teller, who moved to the area with plans to manufacture car seat belts, instead opened a frozen banana stand.  Teller had sold frozen bananas at the Arizona State Fair, and opened his stand - The Original Banana Rolla Rama - right across the street from Phillips' original shop.  In the winter months, Teller hauled the trailer to various county fairs.  When Phillips died a few years later, Teller bought the business and used it to expand to other locations.  Frozen bananas are a tradition on Balboa Island to this day. Bob Fitch created the Frozen Banana in the 1950s on Balboa island maybe earlier. He purchased the spot where the Sugar and Spice sits today from Don Philips, renamed it the  Sugar and Spice. Bob Fitch sold the building around 1978-1979 to Mrs. Banto for $110,000.00.

Cultural references

In the Fox television series Arrested Development, set in Orange County, the Bluth Company owns and runs a frozen banana stand.

See also
 List of regional dishes of the United States

References

External links
Frozen Banana Recipe - Chiquita
WikiHow - How to Freeze a Banana
An Arrested Development inspired recipe for Frozen Bananas

Frozen desserts
Banana dishes